The New Democratic Youth of Alberta (NDYA) is the official youth branch of Alberta's NDP, and they act as a youth advocacy group within the centre-left party. Any party member between the age of 14 and 30 is automatically considered a member of the New Democratic Youth of Alberta (NDYA).

They feel that "issues of working-class empowerment, gender equality, environmental sustainability, and the tolerance of sexual preference, as well as other struggles for social justice, provide the necessary foundation for the formation of a better, more humane, society."

2018 Executive 

The current executive is currently made up of 13 youth from across the province:

The organization's executive serves one-year terms, with a review of the executive every year at either the Alberta NDP's provincial council, provincial convention, or at the NDYA yearly convention.

Navneet Gidda -  Co-Chair

Henry Dawson Wearmouth - Co-Chair

Noah Nicholls - Secretary

2019 Executive 

Kate Pundyk- Co-Chair

Gurinder Brar - Co-Chair

Loveleen Kaur Sidhu - Secretary

Kelsey Fortier - Treasurer

Members of the 2019 executive helped expose a number of lies Jason Kenney spread throughout the 2019 provincial campaign. Such as his lie about the age and occupation of the Alberta NDP's Cochrane-Airdrie East Candidate. Kenney lied to a large number of constituents in Cochrane-Airdrie East by suggesting that the Alberta NDP's candidate in the constituency was 19. In reality, the candidate was 30. Many residents were confused why Kenney would tell such a blatant falsehood.

2020 Executive 

Loveleen Kaur Sidhu - Co-Chair

Olga María Barceló - Co-Chair

Leonard Zasiedko - Secretary

Kelsey Fortier - Treasurer

2022 Executive 
Dolly Cepeda Montufar - Co-Chair

Leonard Zasiedko - Co-Chair

Laura Penner - Secretary

Kaidon Blake - Treasurer

References

Alberta New Democratic Party
Youth wings of political parties in Canada